Show You Love may refer to:
"Show You Love" (Jars of Clay song), 2003
"Show You Love" (Kato and Sigala song), 2017